Poulter Glacier is a glacier in Antarctica, about 180 miles from the South Pole at an elevation of 8,000 feet. It flows east from the Antarctic Plateau past the Rawson Mountains in the Queen Maud Mountains and joins with the Scott Glacier. It was discovered by the Byrd Antarctic Expedition II Geology Party under Quinn Blackburn. It was named by Admiral Richard Byrd for Thomas Poulter.

References

Glaciers of Amundsen Coast